The Royal Australian Air Force is organised into a number of operational, support and training formations located at bases across Australia.

Circa 1998, composite wings in the 95-97 series range were reported to be formed if necessary for operations overseas. In the event, No. 97 Wing RAAF was established on 24 October 1997 to command the RAAF elements deployed for drought relief purposes to Papua New Guinea during Operation Ples Drai. It was led by Wing Commander Chris Richards, who was also the commander of the Air Component of Joint Task Force 105 which had been established for this operation.

Air Force structure

Formations

Note: Only select formations as promulgated by CAF are designated as official command (Military) or directorial (APS) appointments 
*Rank/Title depends on size/complexity/purpose of the formation
~A junior officer of the Air Force is a Pilot Officer(O1), Flying Officer (O2) or Flight Lieutenant (O3). Air Force Warrant Officers (WOFF/E9) hold similar standing to a Flying Officer or Flight Lieutenant - depending on time/experience in rank.
~Air Force public servant non-executive leaders, depending on roles, are designated as; Manager FLTLT(APS5)/SQNLDR(APS6) responsibility depending on size/complexity), Coordinators WOFF(APS4)/FLGOFF(APS4) responsibility), and Officer (APS4 - FSGT/PLTOFF responsibility)
Air Force senior officers are Squadron Leader (APS6/O4), Wing Commander (EL1/O5), Group Captain (EL2/O6).
~Air Force executive public servant officers are designated Senior Managers or Deputy Directors (EL1/O5), Director (EL2) or Executive Director (EL2.1/O6) depending on role and level of responsibilities.
Air Force 'Air Officers' (Flag Rank (Navy), General Rank (Army) are Air Commodore (1*), Air Vice Marshal (2*), Air Marshal (3*) and Air Chief Marshal (4*).
 Air Force public servants of equivalent air officer rank are; (1*) - SES Band-1/Assistant Secretary, (2*) - SES Band-2/First Assistant Secretary, Deputy Secretary (DEPSEC - 3*), and Secretary (SEC - 4*)

Other appointments
Chief of the Defence Force (CDF) – Air Chief Marshal (when RAAF officer)
Vice Chief of the Defence Force (VCDF) – Air Marshal (when RAAF officer)
Chief of Joint Operations (CJOPS) – Air Marshal (when RAAF officer)
Chief Capability Development Group (CCDG) – Air Marshal (when RAAF officer)
Deputy Chief of Air Force (DCAF) – Air Vice Marshal
Commander Integrated Air Defence System (CDR IADS) – Air Vice Marshal
Deputy Chief of Joint Operations (DCJOPS)/Chief of Staff Headquarters Joint Operations Command (COS HQJOC) – Air Vice Marshal (when RAAF officer)
Chief Joint Logistics (CJLOG) – Air Vice Marshal (when RAAF officer)
Chief Information Officer (CIO) – Air Vice Marshal (when RAAF officer)
Commander Joint Health (CJHLTH)- Air Vice Marshal (when RAAF officer)

Air Force Headquarters

Royal Australian Air Force
Structure of contemporary air forces